West of Hell is a 2019 American Western horror film directed by Michael Steves and starring Tony Todd, Michael Eklund and Lance Henriksen.

Cast
Tony Todd
Michael Eklund
Lance Henriksen
Jennifer Laporte
Richard Riehle

Reception
James Evans of Starburst gave the film a negative review and wrote, "Made for nowt and unable to hide budget limitations, the film tries to keep your attention with basic philosophising on good and evil and occasional nudity and gore, but it’s all for nought because there’s little substance here."

References

External links
 
 

American fantasy films
American horror films
American Western (genre) films
2010s English-language films
2010s American films